Lillian Katie Bradley (October 15,1921 – February 11, 1995) was an American mathematician and mathematics educator who in 1960 became the first African-American woman to earn a doctorate in any subject at the University of Texas at Austin. She accomplished this ten years after African-Americans were first admitted to the school, and despite the dominance of the mathematics department at Austin by R. L. Moore, known for his segregationist views and for his snubs of African-American students.

Bradley was born in Tyler, Texas. She earned a bachelor's degree in mathematics in 1938 from Texas College, and a master's degree in mathematics education in 1946 from the University of Michigan. She became a teacher at a segregated black high school in Hawkins, Texas, at Paul Quinn College, and at Texas College, before becoming an assistant professor of mathematics at Prairie View A&M College. There, in 1957–1958, she was awarded a National Science Faculty Fellowship, one of only 100 awarded in the inaugural year of the program.

She completed her doctorate at the University of Texas in July 1960. Her dissertation, in mathematics education, was An Evaluation of the Effectiveness of a Collegiate General Mathematics Course. In 1962 she moved from Prairie View to Texas Southern University, as an associate professor.

Bradley died in February 1995 at the age of 76.

References

1921 births
1995 deaths
20th-century American mathematicians
20th-century women mathematicians
African-American mathematicians
American women mathematicians
Prairie View A&M University people
Texas College alumni
Texas Southern University faculty
University of Michigan alumni
University of Texas at Austin College of Liberal Arts alumni
20th-century African-American women
20th-century African-American people